Municipal Courts Building may refer to the following buildings:
Municipal Courts Building (Chicago, Illinois), listed on the National Register of Historic Places
Municipal Courts Building (St. Louis, Missouri), listed on the National Register of Historic Places in St. Louis